Walter Rayford Tucker III (born May 28, 1957) is an American politician and minister who served as mayor of Compton and a U.S. Representative from California.

Parents and education

Tucker was born in Compton, California, the son of Walter R. Tucker, Jr., a dentist who was mayor of Compton beginning in 1981. The younger Tucker finished Compton High School in 1974 as class valedictorian and attended Princeton University for the next two years. He graduated from the University of Southern California in 1978 with a degree in political science and earned his  J.D. degree from Georgetown University Law Center in 1981. He was admitted to the California State Bar in 1984.

Professional life

Legal practice and mayor of Compton
Tucker was a Los Angeles County deputy district attorney from 1984 to 1986, when he began in private practice as a criminal defense attorney. After Tucker's father died while still in office as mayor of Compton, the younger Tucker won a special election to replace him, becoming the youngest mayor in the city's history at age 33. He served from 1991 to 1992, during the civil unrest in Los Angeles County spawned by the Rodney King verdict.

Congressional career
In 1992, Tucker was elected to the House of Representatives as a Democrat, defeating Lynn Dymally, the daughter of the retiring Representative Mervyn Dymally.

In Congress, Tucker served on the Committee on Public Works and Transportation and the House Small Business Committee, He introduced legislation promoting Random Acts of Kindness, opposed passage of the North American Free Trade Agreement (NAFTA), fought to save the Long Beach Naval Shipyard, and worked to ensure the successful development of the Alameda Corridor Project. He also worked with the Army Corps of Engineers to secure federal funding to repair the long neglected Compton Creek, thus eliminating the possibility of costly flood damage to the homes and property on either side of the waterway.

Tucker resigned from Congress on December 15, 1995, due to scandals involving accepting and demanding bribes while mayor of Compton. Tucker was sentenced to 27 months in prison in 1996 for extortion and tax evasion.

Ministry

Tucker began his active ministry while at the Federal Prison Camp in Lompoc, California. After his release he was hired as the Helps Ministry manager for Crenshaw Christian Center in Los Angeles, and he then joined with Charles Colson's Prison Fellowship Ministry as Los Angeles area director. He moved with his family to Chicago, where for nine years he was pastor of the From the Heart Church Ministries of Chicago. He is now the pastor of the Truth and Love Christian Church in Carson, California.

Personal

Tucker is married to Robin Smith, and they have two children, Walter R. Tucker IV and Autumn Monet Tucker.  He has two sisters, Keta and Camillie, and a brother, Kenneth.

See also
List of African-American United States representatives

References

External links

|-

|-

1957 births
20th-century African-American people
20th-century criminals
21st-century African-American people
African-American mayors in California
African-American members of the United States House of Representatives
African-American people in California politics
American members of the clergy convicted of crimes
American people convicted of tax crimes
California politicians convicted of crimes
Democratic Party members of the United States House of Representatives from California
Georgetown University Law Center alumni
Living people
Mayors of Compton, California
Politicians convicted of extortion under color of official right
University of Southern California alumni